Zug Izland is an American rock band from Detroit, Michigan, United States, currently signed to Psychopathic Records. The group sometimes refers to its fans as "zuggalos".

Background
Zug Izland formed in 2001, named after an industrial site near Detroit. The band was formed by Insane Clown Posse member Violent J (Joseph Bruce) and Mike Puwal, out of Bruce's love of rock music. Bruce wanted to know what a "Juggalo Rock" band would sound like. Zug Izland's songs were written and developed during the recording of Insane Clown Posse's album The Wraith: Shangri-La.

Bruce and Puwal completed the basic tracks for two songs, but still required a lead singer. Bruce wanted a singer similar to Kurt Cobain, Eddie Vedder, Jim Morrison or Axl Rose. Although Syn was sought by three other bands at the time, he joined Zug Izland as their official singer. The band broke onto the national competitive music scene in 2003 with their debut album, Cracked Tiles.

The album peaked at No. 48 on the Billboard Heatseekers chart and at No. 31 on the Top Independent Albums chart. Zug Izland released a follow-up album 3:33 the 1st of June 2004. It peaked at No. 26 on the Top Heatseekers chart and at No. 22 on the Top Independent Albums chart. The release of the 3:33 album amicably fulfilled Psychopathic Records contract with Zug Izland.

After parting ways with Psychopathic Records after the release of 3:33, Zug Izland began writing and recording songs for a new album entitled "Promised Land". The ill-fated album was never released however tracks 'Next To Me", "Lies" and "How Does it Feel" were released officially online with leaked songs "Promised land" and "Woke Up Screaming" surfacing online some time later. The Syn written and recorded "Chemical Girl" was also released via the official Zug Izland MySpace page, however it has also never featured on an album.

In 2005, Zug Izland recorded a cover of Pink Floyd classic "Another Brick In The Wall". The track was a crowd favourite that Zug Izland would often cover at their live shows. Re-working the lyrics, the new track took a "Juggalo" theme replacing Pink Floyd's child chorus with a group of angry Juggalos screaming "Hey! People! Leave Juggalos alone!" in reference to the Juggalo culture's misrepresentation in mainstream media. The finished track was made available through the ZugIzland.com, but never made available on an official release.

Following years of touring and various line up changes, Zug Izland reunited, and returned to Psychopathic Records, announcing plans to reissue Cracked Tiles record a new album and tour with Insane Clown Posse in promotion of ICP's Mighty Death Pop! album. In the December 21, 2012 edition of Hatchet Herald, it was revealed that Zug Izland would release a "greatest hits" album, featuring three newly recorded songs recorded by Violent J and Mike Puwal.

In August 2013 Zug Izland's greatest hits compilation "Toxicology: Zug Izland's Dopest Bangers" was released on Psychopathic Records, their first official release since 3:33 in 2004. The album featured a collection of tracks from their debut album Cracked Tiles, three remastered songs from 3:33 and three new recordings. The new songs reverted to the writing/recording process of Cracked Tiles with Violent J of Insane Clown Posse writing lyrics and Mike P writing the music. According to Faygoluvers.net the line up is now Syn, Mike P, D-Lay & 2 Phat.

Music style
Allmusic reviewer Johnny Loftus describes Zug Izland's music style as incorporating elements of piano ballads, goth, industrial and electronic music, nu metal and horror film scores. According to Loftus, "Zug Izland's sparer style [is] unique in an alt-metal climate of two-guitar lineups and monstrous six-string bass bottom ends."

Band members
Current
Syn — Lead Vocals (2001–2009; 2012–present)
2 Phat - drums (2005–2009; 2018- present)
Mike P. — guitar (2001–2004; 2012–present)
D-Lay — bass (2012–present)
DJ Clay - DJ (2012–present)

Former
Guido Milligan  — bass (2001–2002, 2004)
Rex Hamilton  — bass (2004–2007)
Dan Miller  — keyboards (2003–2004)
Lil Pig – drums (2001–2004; 2012–2017)
 The Son Of Rock, Joey V. – lead guitar (2007–2009, 2012)

Discography
Cracked Tiles (January 31, 2003) (Psychopathic Records)
3:33 (June 1, 2004) (Ax & Smash Records/Psychopathic Records)
Toxicology: Zug Izlands Dopest Bangers (August 13, 2013) (Psychopathic Records)
The Promised Land / Nebula (September 10, 2016) (Independent release)
The Promised Land / Event Horizon (July 17, 2018) (Independent release)

Features
On the Bloodstepp track "Underground MVP" also featuring Big Hoodoo, Axe Murder Boyz, Spice 1, DJ Clay and KidCrusher from the album Grand Theft UFO: Floppy Disk Edition released in 2014.

References

External links
Zug Izland on Myspace

American alternative metal musical groups
Musical groups from Detroit
Alternative rock groups from Michigan
Musical groups established in 2003
Psychopathic Records artists